Naga, officially the Municipality of Naga (Chavacano: Municipalidad de Naga), is a 3rd class municipality in the province of Zamboanga Sibugay, Philippines. According to the 2020 census, it has a population of 41,743 people.

Geography

Barangays
Naga is politically subdivided into 23 barangays.

Climate

Demographics

Economy

References

External links
 [ Philippine Standard Geographic Code]
Philippine Census Information

Municipalities of Zamboanga Sibugay